Mary Catterall (1922–2015) was a British medical doctor and sculptor.

Early life 
Mary Catterall was born in London to William Rowley Williamson and Anne Marguerite Wlliamson. Catterall attended St Helen's School in Middlesex. She worked as a despatch rider for the Home Guard from 1939 to 1941.

Medical career 
Catterall is recognised across the world for her pioneering work in neutron therapy. In 1943, she completed her initial training as a physiotherapist before deciding to re-train as a doctor. Having passed her first MB, Catterall was accepted at the London Hospital Medical School in an intake of 70 men and seven women. In 1959–1960, Catterall was a Research Fellow at the University of Leeds.

In the 1960s Catterall gained international attention for her work at Hammersmith Hospital using an early 5 MeV cyclotron for neutron therapy treatment. She worked at Hammersmith Hospital until 1987, and wrote articles for medical journals during this period. In 1978 Catterall gave a guest lecture at the Fermi National Accelerator Laboratory in Illinois. By 1982, the Cyclotron Unit at Hammersmith Hospital was at risk of closure, and Catterall was offered a job in the United States of America.

Catterall was a member of the British Institute of Radiology, Royal College of Radiologists and a Fellow of the American College of Radiology. In 1982, Catterall was awarded an honorary degree by Durham University as part of their 150th anniversary events.

Sculpture 
Catterall first began to model in clay during the Second World War. She later learned from the sculptor Humphrey Paget. Around 1968–1969, Catterall created a maquette in vinyl gel plaster for a memorial to John F. Kennedy, consisting of a group of figures representing Kennedy's interests including Medicare, race issues and underdeveloped countries.

Catterall was a member of the Chelsea Art Society. In 1998, Catterall sculpted a bust of John Ruskin to be exhibited in the Summer Exhibition at Holy Trinity, Sloane Street. The National Army Museum acquired five Bosnian sculptures by Catterall in 2008.

Collections 
Catterall's work is held in the following permanent public collections:

Legacy 
The annual Dr Mary Catterall Lecture is organised by the Cyclotron Trust for Cancer Treatment, and was first delivered in 2016.

Catterall established the charity Encouragement Through The Arts and Talking (ETAT), which "aims to relieve isolation and stimulate new ideas through participation in the arts."

References

External links 
 
Death notice in the Telegraph Newspaper

1922 births
2015 deaths
20th-century English women artists
21st-century English women artists
British women medical doctors
English women medical doctors
English women sculptors
Sculptors from London